Danganronpa 2: Goodbye Despair is a 2012 visual novel developed by Spike Chunsoft. It is the second game in the Danganronpa franchise following Danganronpa: Trigger Happy Havoc (2010). It was first released in Japan for PlayStation Portable in July 2012, and a port for PlayStation Vita was released in Japan in October 2013. NIS America released the game worldwide in September 2014; a port for PC was released in April 2016 and a bundle for PlayStation 4 called Danganronpa 1-2 Reload, also containing the first Danganronpa game, was released in March 2017. An enhanced version with the subtitle Anniversary Edition was released for Android and iOS in August 2020, for Nintendo Switch in November 2021, and for Microsoft Windows and Xbox One May 2022.

Development of the game started as Kazutaka Kodaka was writing the light novel prequel Danganronpa Zero and added hints about a sequel to the novel following their approval. Kodaka aimed to develop a unique plot to give players more mysterious elements in a group of islands, inspired by the television series Lost. The protagonist Hajime Hinata is part of a group of high-school students who are trapped on a tropical island by their high school's headmaster Monokuma, a sentient stuffed bear, along with Monomi, a sentient stuffed rabbit. Similar to the first game, to leave the island, students must kill one of their peers and not be caught in the subsequent investigation and trial.

The game was well received based on sales and critics. Critical response to the game's narrative and cast was generally favorable. However, the gameplay elements involving class trials earned mixed responses; some writers found some parts of the game uninteresting, while early ones proved unchallenging. Danganronpa 2: Goodbye Despair was followed by the spin-off Danganronpa Another Episode: Ultra Despair Girls, which was released on September 25, 2014, and the anime Danganronpa 3: The End of Hope's Peak High School, which ran from July 11, 2016, to September 29, 2016. A loose sequel to the series, called Danganronpa V3: Killing Harmony, with similar gameplay but a different storyline was released on January 12, 2017.

Gameplay

In a similar manner to the series' previous game, Danganronpa 2 has two modes of gameplay; School Life, which is split into Daily Life and Deadly Life sections, and the Class Trial. In the dating sim-like "Daily Life" section, players interact with other characters and progress through the plot. Conversing with characters during "Free Time" sections earns items known as Hope Fragments, which can be exchanged for skills that can be used in the Class Trial, increasing the protagonist's skill in debates. Players earn currency known as Monocoins by finding hidden Monokuma Figures and performing well in trials. Monocoins can be exchanged for presents that can be given to other characters during Free Time segments and thus create more Hope Fragments. In the Deadly Life section, which occurs when players discover a crime scene, the player must search for evidence that will help them in the upcoming Class Trial to expose the culprit.

The Class Trial, in which players must determine the identity of a culprit, has the same features as the previous game with new gameplay elements. Class Trials, which uses the first-person shooter genre, mostly consist of Nonstop Debates, in which players must find weaknesses in the students' discussions and shoot them with "Truth Bullets" that contradict them. Yellow "Argue Spots" and blue "Agree Spots" must be shot with a Truth Bullet, indicating someone is telling the truth. In the minigame Hangman's Gambit, players must combine matching letters appearing from both sides of the screen before they collide and combine incorrectly. Combined letters may either be destroyed or used to spell a clue. "Panic Talk Action" replaces "Bullet Time Battle", with a similar rhythmic timing gameplay mechanic used to overcome a student's mental defenses as the latter refuses to listen to logic. Controls from the last game are slightly revised; players must spell out a phrase in the correct order at the end of the section rather than firing a specific Truth Bullet. In the Closing Argument, players fill in a comic strip depicting the events of a crime; panels are selected from stocks, and must be chosen correctly, rather than being available from the start.

New gameplay elements have been added to the Class Trial. Rebuttal Showdowns take place when a student tries to refute the player's logic. In these sections, players must slash apart their opponents' argument to gain dominance in the conversation and reveal new information before using a "Truth Blade" to strike the correct weak point when it appears. Logic Dive is a snowboarding minigame in which players steer themselves down a logical tube while avoiding obstacles and pitfalls, and occasionally choosing between multiple routes based on a question to arrive at a logical conclusion. The final segment Spot Select requires players to examine an image and indicate an important spot.

Besides the Class Trials and Daily Event, Goodbye Despair also offers several mini-games. Players always have access to a virtual pet, accessed from the pause menu, that grows as players walk in the game and earns players rewards based on its Hope and Despair statistics. Magical Girl Miracle☆Monomi is a minigame in which players control Monomi, a mentor of the main characters, who fights waves of monsters. Island Mode, which is available after clearing the game once, is an alternative mode in which the students are not subjected to Monokuma's killing game and aim to make friends with each other and earn Hope Fragments, allowing players to bond with characters more easily than in the main story mode. Danganronpa IF, a short story depicting an alternative storyline for Danganronpa: Trigger Happy Havoc, is also unlocked after clearing the game once.

Plot

In Goodbye Despair, players control Hajime Hinata, an amnesiac boy who has just become one of Hope's Peak Academy's "Ultimate" students alongside fifteen others who befriend the calm but mentally unstable Nagito Komaeda. The game is set on a remote tropical island called Jabberwock Island, where they have been marooned by their alleged teacher, a small, rabbit-like mascot named Usami, who claims it to be a field trip. However, the school's principal Monokuma announces the students cannot leave the island unless they murder another student and get away with it. If the students can identify a murderer in a Class Trial, that culprit is executed, but if they make the wrong assumption the killer goes free whilst everyone else is sentenced to death.

Several students are murdered over the course of the game, and, through Hajime's investigation, the killers are discovered and executed. Byakuya Togami (later revealed to be the Ultimate Impostor) is inadvertently killed by Chef Teruteru Hanamura in an attempt to stop Nagito from committing the first murder. Photographer Mahiru Koizumi is killed by swordswoman Peko Pekoyama, to prevent yakuza Fuyuhiko Kuzuryu from killing her to avenge his sister. Musician Ibuki Mioda and traditional dancer Hiyoko Saionji are killed by nurse Mikan Tsumiki as she was under the effects of Despair Disease. Team Manager Nekomaru Nidai is killed by animal breeder Gundham Tanaka in an honorable duel to prevent the rest of the students starving to death. As these murders occur, new areas of the islands are discovered and the group becomes aware of an organization monitoring them, the "Future Foundation". Nagito, through a convoluted process, arranges his own death so that Chiaki Nanami is considered his killer, and executed. During the graduation, it is learnt that she is actually an AI program created by the late Chihiro Fujisaki to observe and protect the students during the Future Foundation's experiment. After Chiaki's death, Hajime recovers a memory of arriving at the islands with Nagito, who had transplanted the arm of a woman, Junko Enoshima. As reality falls apart around him, Hajime learns that Nagito and his fellow students are surviving members of Ultimate Despair, a group Junko led, whose terrorist actions led to a crisis known as The Biggest, Most Awful, Most Tragic Event in Human History, also known The Tragedy, which caused societal collapse worldwide.

The Future Foundation has been attempting to undo Ultimate Despair's damage. Makoto Naegi captured the surviving members but, rather than executing them, decided to rehabilitate them by erasing their memories and putting them in a virtual reality program. Makoto warns Hajime that an artificial intelligence copy of Junko has hijacked their program and is trying to manipulate events to possess the bodies of the deceased students, which are still intact in the real world, once the surviving students "graduate". Alter Ego Junko's ultimate plan is to download herself into every person on the planet. Makoto tells Hajime if the class votes not to graduate, it will allow him to reset the system and purge Alter Ego Junko.

Junko attempts to deter Hajime by revealing he is Izuru Kamukura, the former leader of Ultimate Despair. The other students hesitate, afraid of reverting to their original personalities, but Hajime eventually finds the inner courage to thwart Alter Ego Junko's plan, and persuades the other students, Fuyuhiko, princess Sonia Nevermind, mechanic Kazuichi Soda, and gymnast Akane Owari to refuse graduation, proposing that they create a future in which they do not have to forget. Hajime, Makoto and the others reset the system, delete Alter Ego Junko and retain their memories. In the epilogue, Makoto is confident the students will find a way to revive their friends.

Development and release

After the release of the first Danganronpa game, there were no plans for a sequel, and the game's development team was split up to work on other projects. As a result, writer Kazutaka Kodaka was attracted to the idea of creating the novel Danganronpa Zero, which he decided to write after consulting producer Terasawa. While writing Zero, Kodaka was approached by Terasawa with the idea of writing a sequel, and took on writing for both Zero and Goodbye Despair concurrently, eventually finishing with the former in October 2011. Kodaka considers the novels needed more structuring work than the game. As Zero foreshadows events of Goodbye Despair, Kodaka recommends gamers read Zero before playing the sequel. The writer attempted to create unique storytelling methods for Goodbye Despair; this is more relevant to the second half of the story, in which Hajime starts playing a video game when the player is already controlling Hajime. In retrospect, Kodaka felt proud of the way the game's segments were developed. While he personally prefers the original Danganronpa over the second one, Kodaka felt more emotionally moved by the second half of Goodbye Despair.

To bring more variety to the sequel, Monokuma was given a counterpart named Monomi (or Usami). Kodaka also said the islands were used to give players more content to explore, comparing the sequel to the television series Lost in terms of amount of plot twists and how different the narrative is. Kodaka said characters like Nagito, Byakuya and Gundham were created to confuse returning players due to their similarities with characters from previous games. However, he still feels he made the cast more human as the story progresses. The characters were designed by Rui Komatsuzaki. In early sketches, Hajime's design differed from those used for the series; his hair was originally meant to be longer, and at one point, he was designed to be wearing glasses. He was the earliest designed the character which generated a major contrast between his white clothing to Nagito's dark clothing.

Nagito was made to be an absolute rival to Hajime, with a relationship similar to the one between the Joker and Batman in Batman (1989). To confuse gamers and suggest the characters may be the same person, Makoto and Nagito were both voiced by female actor Megumi Ogata. The name "Nagito Komaeda" was conceived as an anagram for "Naegi Makoto da" ("I am Makoto Naegi") to infer it is a pseudonym. Ogata had problems playing Nagito because she did not understand him. Komaeda was introduced with the same Lucky Talent as Makoto Naegi but the staff considered them opposites based on their ideals of "hope". There was a lack of pre-release promotion materials for the original version of Goodbye Despair in its release year. This surprised Ogata because the anagram had been kept secret from the other developers and voice actors, including Ogata.

Other characters include the heroine Chiaki Nanami with whom Hajime would often interact and bond romantically; Kodaka said the relationship between Makoto and Kyoko Kirigiri, a skilled detective and supporting character from the previous game, was meant to help the player solve cases. In the Japanese version of the game, Hajime was voiced by Minami Takayama, famous for voicing the main character of the detective manga Case Closed; the staff put a reference to her career in the snowboarding minigame of Goodbye Despair as Jimmy Kudo often surfs a turbo skateboard. Junko's resurrection was left to the player's interpretation. Kodaka compared her to comic book villains like the Joker and Magneto who always survive. Kodaka said Junko can be killed and that she may be the strongest villain he ever created.

Danganronpa 2 was first released for the PlayStation Portable in Japan on July 26, 2012. A limited edition that includes a Monokuma PSP pouch, an art booklet, a soundtrack and audio commentary CD, keychains and badges, and a download code for a custom theme was available. A compilation of the game and its predecessor, Danganronpa: Trigger Happy Havoc, titled Danganronpa 1・2 Reload, with new touch controls and high resolution graphics, was released in Japan for the PlayStation Vita on October 10, 2013.

After releasing the Vita remake of the first game in North America and Europe in February 2014, NIS America released the sequel under the name Danganronpa 2: Goodbye Despair  in Western territories in September 2014. Localization member Robert Schiotis said finding a voice actor for Nagito in the English-language version proved challenging because he is meant to clash with Makoto's ideals. Bryce Papenbrook voiced both characters, making the connections between them more interesting according to localization staff. Johnny Yong Bosch took the role of Hajime; Bosch found being immersed in Hinata's role difficult due to the lack of artwork depicting him. When a Danganronpa player asked him to sign a copy of Goodbye Despair, Bosch could better understand the character he voiced. As well as a standard edition, a limited edition was released via NIS America's online store, including an art book, soundtrack CD, stickers, Monokuma medals, and a pair of sunglasses. Danganronpa 1・2 Reload was also released in North America and Europe for PlayStation 4 in March 2017. An enhanced version for Android and iOS, under the name Danganronpa 2: Goodbye Despair Anniversary Edition, was released on August 20, 2020. This version features the gallery mode, allowing players to replay the character voices and view event illustrations. During E3 2021, it was announced that this version of the game will also be released for the Nintendo Switch in 2021, both as part of the Danganronpa Decadence bundle, as well as separately. It was also released for Xbox One and Windows via Microsoft Store on May 10, 2022. It was made available through Xbox Game Pass on the same day.

Reception

Critical response

Danganronpa 2: Goodbye Despair received "generally favorable" reviews based on Metacritic reviews. Upon its release in North America, the game was met with praise for its plot. VideoGamer said "Danganronpa 2 tells a great story that is worthy of your time" while GameSpot was "hooked from the get-go, enthralled by every surprise turn taken by the story, stunned by every unexpected character revelation, devastated at every death, and pumping my fist at every small victory against that bastard Monokuma". Polygon's reviewer found the cast's traits repetitive but enjoyed the dating sim elements. He found the trials more challenging and engaging than those of the original game, including the searches for clues when interacting with the cast. He said newcomers to the franchise would be confused by the story of Goodbye Despair, which is connected with the plot of the first game. On the other hand, Game Revolution stated the mystery involving the connection between two Danganronpa games is obvious and it does not confuse newcomers, who would notice clues. The reviewer also said the humor is more adult and perverted than that of the first game, making it feel more innovative for its genre.

The class trials earned mixed responses; Giant Bomb praised the way the class trials become progressively more challenging.  According to Hardcore Gamer, "So much of Dangranonpa 2 is an immediate, purposeful retread in both mechanics and storytelling" he felt there were not many improvements. Hardcore Gamer appreciated the new setting and enjoyed the multiple plot twists for being more difficult to understand than those of the previous game, and added references to other games made him feel the plot is self-aware. Touch Arcade praised the handling of the cellphone versions for being easy to handle but he criticized the poor handling of the camera in the cellphone game and wanted the developers to fix this issue. GameSpot enjoyed the class trials for staying true to the original formula but gave a negative response to the minigames, which the reviewer said feel unnecessary. GameSpot also praised the handling of the plot and cast. GameRevolution said the additions to the original class trial system are enjoyable because they provide more variety in terms of gameplay but found some mechanics annoying. Due to the multiple minigames of the class trials, Game Revolution wished the game had focused more on its visual novel style, which he felt is the part of the game that stood out the most. Hardcore Gamer enjoyed the blade-based style in the form of the Rebuttals and the revised Hangman’s Gambit, which come across as improvements. According to Video Gamer, the gameplay mechanics are one of the title's weak points.

The characters and their interactions with Hajime were the subject of praise. Video Gamer praised the returning villain Monokuma and said the cast provide enjoyment despite having mixed thoughts about their originality due to most being stereotypes previously seen in other games. Joystiq praised the balance between lighthearted moments and violent deaths, and said the characters are likable and distinct enough from each other enough to make their dating sim events enjoyable and easy. Touch Arcade liked the characters and their dating sim elements, favoriting Ibuki Moda and Nagito Komaeda. While originally viewing the cast as archetypes, GameInformer noted the writing was good at fleshing them out. Hardcore Gamer had mixed feelings in regards to the cast, viewing some as likable and others as annoying despite the more engaging narrative. Similarly, Polygon found few character bondings in the game worthwhile due to some being less likable than the original Danganronpa and the rest dying across the title.

Danganronpa 2: Goodbye Despair won an "Award of Excellence" at the Japan Game Awards 2013 ceremony. Hardcore Gamer awarded it "Best PS Vita Game", "Best New Character" (Monokuma) and "Best Adventure Game". Famitsu  readers voted it the best game of 2012.

Sales
The game sold 69,000 copies during its first week on sale in Japan and was the fifth best-selling game of the week. In Japan, the PSP version sold 162,408 copies during its life cycle. 
The Steam release had an estimated 178,000 players by July 2018.

Other media and appearances

Several manga publications based on Danganronpa 2: Goodbye Despair have been conceived. A direct adaptation began serialization in Enterbrain's Famitsu Comic Clear magazine from December 10, 2012. The spin-off manga Dangan Island - Kokoro Tokonatsu Kokoronpa♪, Chō-Kōkō-Kyū no Kōun to Kibō to Zetsubō, and Nanami Chiaki no Sayonara Zetsubō Daibōken were published by Mag Garden from October 2013. Another spin-off, Nangoku Zetsubo Carnival!, was serialized in GA Bunko's magazine from April 2013. Other two include 4Koma Kings and Comic Anthology compilations by various artists. Dark Horse Comics has released the Chō-Kōkō-Kyū no Kōun to Kibō to Zetsubō manga under the title Danganronpa 2: Ultimate Luck and Hope and Despair in North America on September 15, 2018. They also published the first of three volumes of the Super Danganronpa 2: Sayonara Zetsubou Gakuen manga, as Danganronpa 2: Goodbye Despair in North America, on March 25, 2020.

Monomi appears at the end of the final episode of the first game's 2013 anime television adaptation Danganronpa: The Animation. An anime adaptation of Danganronpa 2: Goodbye Despair was initially planned but the producers instead chose to make an original anime series titled Danganronpa 3: The End of Hope's Peak High School, which aired between July and September 2016. The series' second part Despair Arc focuses on the characters of Goodbye Despair prior to the events of the first game.

A Monomi costume is available in the Japanese PS Vita and PlayStation 3 versions of Terraria. Downloadable outfits based on Monokuma and Monomi also appear in the Super Sonico game Motto! SoniComi.

Notes

References

External links

2012 video games
Adventure games
Android (operating system) games
Danganronpa video games
Dark Horse Comics titles
Enterbrain manga
Gangs in fiction
IOS games
Linux games
MacOS games
Mag Garden manga
Mystery video games
Nintendo Switch games
Nippon Ichi Software games
PlayStation Portable games
PlayStation Vita games
PlayStation 4 games
School life in anime and manga
School-themed video games
Shōnen manga
Single-player video games
Spike Chunsoft video games
Video game sequels
Video games about amnesia
Video games about death games
Video games about virtual reality
Video games developed in Japan
Video games set on fictional islands
Video games scored by Masafumi Takada
Video games with alternate endings
Visual novels
Windows games
Works about the Yakuza
Xbox Cloud Gaming games
Xbox One games